Acanthodica xylinoides is a moth of the family Noctuidae. It is found in Ecuador.

Catocalina
Moths of South America
Moths described in 1894